The S2 8.0 B is an American trailerable sailboat that was designed by Arthur Edmunds as a cruiser and first built in 1976. The designation indicates the approximate length overall in meters. The design uses the same hull as the S2 8.0 A and the S2 8.0 C.

Production
The design was built by S2 Yachts in Holland, Michigan, United States, between 1976 and 1983, with 426 boats completed, but it is now out of production.

Design
The S2 8.0 B is a recreational keelboat, built predominantly of fiberglass, with wood trim. It has a masthead sloop rig, a raked stem, a slightly angled transom, an internally mounted spade-type rudder controlled by a tiller and a fixed fin keel, shoal draft keel or keel and centerboard. It displaces  and carries  of lead ballast.

A version with a tall rig was also available, with a mast about  taller.

The boat is fitted with an inboard engine  for docking and maneuvering, with a saildrive optional.

The design has sleeping accommodation for four people, with a double "V"-berth in the bow cabin, a straight settee berth on the port side in the main cabin and an aft quarter berth on the port side. The galley is located on the starboard side at the companionway ladder. The galley is "L"-shaped and is equipped with a two-burner stove, an ice box and a sink. The head is located just aft of the bow cabin on the port side.

See also
List of sailing boat types

References

Keelboats
1970s sailboat type designs
Sailing yachts
Trailer sailers
Sailboat type designs by Arthur Edmunds
Sailboat types built by S2 Yachts